The House of Molitor (German: Das Haus Molitor) is a 1922 Austrian silent film directed by Hans Karl Breslauer and starring Alfred Abel, Anny Miletty and Magda Unger.

Cast
 Alfred Abel as Molitor 
 Anny Miletty
 Magda Unger
 Hans Effenberger
 Hela Lukacz
 Eugen Preiß
 Pauline Schweighofer
 Willy Czapp
 Oliver Turchanyi

References

Bibliography
 Elisabeth Büttner & Christian Dewald. Das tägliche Brennen: eine Geschichte des österreichischen Films von den Anfängen bis 1945, Volume 1. Residenz, 2002.

External links

1922 films
Austrian silent feature films
Films directed by Hans Karl Breslauer
Austrian black-and-white films